Lynn Dale Stucky (born February 20, 1958) is an American veterinarian originally from Kansas, who is a Republican member of the Texas House of Representatives for the 64th District in Denton County in the northern portion of the state. Earlier, Stucky served on the board of the Sanger Independent School District for fifteen years, four as the president.

Stucky was elected to the House in 2016, when the incumbent Republican in the district, Myra Crownover, of Lake Dallas, retired after sixteen years in the position.

In 2017, Stucky joined state Senator Kirk Watson of Austin in filing legislation to refer the issue of feral hog proliferation to a university study to determine what impact that poisoning these animals, as proposed by Texas Agriculture Commissioner Sid Miller, would have on the land, agriculture, and hunters. Stucky and Watson want the research conducted before Miller can proceed with his proposal to exterminate the hogs, which have caused millions of dollars in damage to area landowners.

Electoral history 
In the general election held on November 6, 2018, Stucky won his second term with 36,195 votes (52.8 percent) to Democratic nominee Andrew Morris' 30,465 (44.5 percent). Libertarian Party nominee Nick Dietrich held the remaining 1,384 votes (2.7 percent).

References

External links
 Campaign website
 State legislative page
 Lynn Stucky at the Texas Tribune

1958 births
Living people
Republican Party members of the Texas House of Representatives
21st-century American politicians
American veterinarians
Kansas State University alumni
People from McPherson County, Kansas
People from Sanger, Texas
Male veterinarians